Chuvash-Karamaly (Sıwaş-Qaramalı; , Çăvaş Xuramalĕ) is a rural locality (a selo) and the administrative centre of Chuvash-Karamalinsky Selsoviet, Aurgazinsky District, Bashkortostan, Russia. The population was 13 as of 2010. There are 12 streets.

Geography 
Chuvash-Karamaly is located 24 km southeast of Tolbazy (the district's administrative centre) by road. Starye Karamaly is the nearest rural locality.

References 

Rural localities in Aurgazinsky District